Nelson "Kelly" Ball (11 October 1908 – 9 May 1986) was a New Zealand rugby union player. A wing, Ball represented Wanganui and  Wellington at a provincial level, and was a member of the New Zealand national side, the All Blacks, from 1931 to 1936. He played 22 matches for the All Blacks including five internationals.

Ball moved to South Africa in 1948 and lived there for the rest of his life. He was the father of New Zealand cartoonist Murray Ball, and a first cousin of Bill Francis, who played for the All Blacks between 1913 and 1914.

References

1908 births
1986 deaths
People from Foxton, New Zealand
People educated at Feilding High School
New Zealand rugby union players
New Zealand international rugby union players
Wanganui rugby union players
Wellington rugby union players
Rugby union wings
New Zealand emigrants to South Africa
Rugby union players from Manawatū-Whanganui